Oliver Sensen is a German philosopher and Associate Professor of Philosophy at Tulane University. 
He is known for his expertise on Kantian philosophy. 
Sensen is the vice-president of North American Kant Society.

Books
 Human Dignity, Cambridge University Press, forthcoming
 Kant on Human Dignity, de Gruyter, 2011; paperback, 2016
 Kant on Moral Autonomy (ed.), Cambridge University Press, 2012
 Respect (ed.), Oxford University Press, forthcoming
 The Emergence of Autonomy in Kant's Moral Theory (ed.), Cambridge University Press, 2018
 Kant's Lectures on Ethics: A Critical Guide (ed.), Cambridge University Press, 2015
 Kant's Tugendlehre. A Commentary (ed.), de Gruyter, 2012

References

External links
 Oliver Sensen at Tulane University
 

German philosophers
Philosophy academics
Alumni of the University of Cambridge
Tulane University faculty
Living people
Kant scholars
Date of birth missing (living people)
Year of birth missing (living people)